The 2007–08 Saint Joseph's Hawks basketball team represented Saint Joseph's University during the 2007–08 NCAA Division I men's basketball season. The Hawks, led by 13th-year head coach Phil Martelli, played their home games at Alumni Memorial Fieldhouse in Philadelphia, Pennsylvania as members of the Atlantic 10 Conference. After finishing the regular season tied for fourth in the A-10 standings, the Hawks reached the championship game of the A-10 tournament before losing to Temple. Saint Joseph's secured an at-large bid to the NCAA tournament as No. 11 seed in the East region. In the opening round, the Hawks were defeated by Oklahoma to end the season at 21–13 (9–7 A-10).

Roster

Schedule

|-
!colspan=12 style=| Regular season

|-
!colspan=12 style=| A-10 tournament

|-
!colspan=12 style=| NCAA tournament

References 

Saint Joseph's Hawks men's basketball seasons
Saint Joseph's
Saint Joseph's
Saint Joseph's
Saint Joseph's